Budapest Honvéd Football Club, commonly known as Budapest Honvéd or simply Honvéd, is a Hungarian sports club based in Kispest, Budapest, with the colours of red and black. The club is best known for its football team. Honvéd means the Homeland Defence. Originally formed as Kispest AC, they became Kispest FC in 1926 before reverting to their original name in 1944.

The team enjoyed a golden age during the 1950s when it was renamed Budapesti Honvéd SE and became the Hungarian Army team. The club's top players from this era, Ferenc Puskás, Sándor Kocsis, József Bozsik, Zoltán Czibor, and Gyula Grosics helped the club win the Hungarian League four times during the 1950s and also formed the nucleus of the legendary Hungarian national team popularly known as the Mighty Magyars.

During the 1980s and early 1990s, the club enjoyed another successful period, winning a further eight Hungarian League titles. They also won league and cup doubles in 1985 and 1989. In 1991, the club was renamed Kispest Honvéd FC and adopted its current name in 2003.

When the club was originally formed in 1909, it also organised teams that competed in fencing, cycling, gymnastics, wrestling, athletics, boxing, and tennis. Later, the Honvéd family was extended to include a water polo team, now known as Groupama Honvéd, a 33-times basketball-champion team and a handball team that were European Champions in 1982.

History

Budapest Honvéd FC were founded in 1909 as Kispesti AC. At domestic level they first entered the Nemzeti Bajnokság I in the 1916–17 season. Their first success came in the 1926 Magyar Kupa season when they beat Budapesti EAC in the final.

Stadium

Budapest Honvéd's first stadium was opened in 1913. On 5 August 2018, the last match was played at the stadium. The match was won by Honvéd against Paksi FC on the 3rd match day of the 2018–19 Nemzeti Bajnokság I. The only goal was scored by Danilo in the 48th minute. The referee was Viktor Kassai. The stadium was demolished in 2019.

The new stadium of the club was opened in 2021. The first match was played between Budapest Honvéd FC II and Szekszárdi UFC in the 2020–21 Nemzeti Bajnokság III season. The stadium was selected to host the 2021 UEFA European Under-21 Championship.

Crest and colours

Manufacturers and shirt sponsors
The following table shows in detail Budapest Honvéd FC kit manufacturers and shirt sponsors by year:

Honours
 Nemzeti Bajnokság I
 Winners (14): 1949–50, 1950, 1952, 1954, 1955, 1979–80, 1983–84, 1984–85, 1985–86, 1987–88, 1988–89, 1990–91, 1992–93, 2016–17
 Magyar Kupa
 Winners (8): 1925–26, 1964, 1984–85, 1988–89, 1995–96, 2006–07, 2008–09, 2019–20
 UEFA Cup
 Quarter final (1): 1979/79
 Mitropa Cup
 Winners (1): 1959

Friendly
Tournoi de Pâques du Red Star
 Winners (1): 1932
 Trofeo Ciudad de Vigo
 Winners (1): 1974

Youth teams
 Puskás Cup:
 Winners (5): 2010, 2011, 2012, 2015, 2016

Players

Current squad

Players with multiple nationalities
   Ivan Lovrić

Out on loan

Retired numbers

10 –  Ferenc Puskás, Forward (1949–56). Number retired in July 2000.

Notable former players
Had senior international cap(s) for their respective countries.  
Players whose name is listed in bold represented their countries while playing for Budapest Honvéd FC.

  Abraham
  József Andrusch
   Benjamin Angoua
  Zsolt Bárányos
  Balázs Bérczy
  Bertalan Bicskei
  János Biri
  Igor Bogdanović
  József Bozsik
  Kris Bright
  István Brockhauser
  László Budai
  Gábor Bukrán
  Alfi Conteh-Lacalle
  Aurél Csertői
  Zoltán Czibor
  László Dajka
  András Debreceni
  Lajos Détári
  Mamadou Diakité
  László Disztl
  Péter Disztl
  Cristian Dulca
  József Duró
  József Eisenhoffer
  Gábor Egressy
  Márton Esterházy
  Emeka Ezeugo
  László Farkasházy
  Pál Fischer
  Imre Garaba
  Genito
  Ivo Georgiev
  Gyula Grosics
  Sándor Gujdár
  Emir Hadžić
  Gábor Halmai
  István Hamar
  Zoltán Hercegfalvi
  Ádám Hrepka
  János Hrutka
  Harmony Ikande
  Béla Illés
  Péter Kabát
  Mihály Kincses
  István Kocsis
  Lajos Kocsis
  Sándor Kocsis
  Imre Komora
  Antal Kotász
  Béla Kovács
  Ervin Kovács
  Kálmán Kovács
  Mihály Kozma
  László Kuti
  Davide Lanzafame
  Almiro Lobo
  Gyula Lóránt
  Misheck Lungu
  Ferenc Machos
  János Marozsán
  Gábor Márton
  János Mátyus
  József Mészáros
  Vasile Miriuță
  Hélder Muianga
  Antal Nagy (1944)
  Antal Nagy (1956)
  Norbert Németh
  István Nyers
  Sándor Pintér
  István Pisont
  Attila Plókai
  Ferenc Puskás
  László Pusztai
  István Sallói
  Ferenc Sipos
  Lajos Szűcs
  Ákos Takács
  Zoltán Takács
  Lajos Tichy
  Sándor Torghelle
  Mihály Tóth
  József Varga
  Gábor Vincze
  István Vincze
  Paulo Albarracín
  Bruno Enríquez
  César Mayuri
  Dragan Vukmir
  Lukáš Zelenka
  Zalán Zombori

Non-playing staff

Management
As of 14 December 2022

First team staff
As of 5 December 2022

Ownership

In 2022, Chris Dochery was appointed as the new sport director of the club.

Chris Docherty said in an interview that the club cannot sign any new players for financial problems in the middle of the 2022-23 Nemzeti Bajnokság I season.

Owners

 2006–2019:  Quinex America LLC (George F. Hemingway)
 2019–present:  Reditus Equity (Zoltán Bozó)

See also
History of Budapest Honvéd FC
List of Budapest Honvéd FC seasons
Budapest Honvéd FC in European football
List of Budapest Honvéd FC managers

Sources
 Behind The Curtain – Travels in Eastern European Football: Jonathan Wilson (2006)
 50 Years of the European Cup and Champions League: Keir Radnedge (2005)

References

External links

 
 Official website (archived)
 Puskás on Puskás Rogan Taylor and Klara Jamrich (1998)
 Mitropa Cup 1959

 
Association football clubs established in 1909
Military association football clubs in Hungary
Football clubs in Budapest
Football clubs in Hungary
1909 establishments in Hungary